The Boeing 707 is an American, long-range, narrow-body airliner, the first jetliner developed and produced by Boeing Commercial Airplanes.

Developed from the Boeing 367-80 prototype first flown in 1954, the initial  first flew on December 20, 1957.
Pan American World Airways began regular 707 service on October 26, 1958.

With versions produced until 1979, the 707 was a swept wing, quadjet with podded engines. Its larger fuselage cross-section allowed six-abreast economy seating, retained in the later 720, 727, 737, and 757 models.

Although it was not the first commercial jetliner in service, the 707 was the first to be widespread and is often credited with beginning the Jet Age.
It dominated passenger air transport in the 1960s, and remained common through the 1970s, on domestic, transcontinental, and transatlantic flights, as well as cargo and military applications.
It established Boeing as a dominant airliner manufacturer with its 7x7 series.

The initial,   was powered by Pratt & Whitney JT3C turbojet engines.
The shortened long-range  and the more powerful  entered service in 1959.

The 720, a lighter short-range variant, was also introduced in 1960.
Powered by Pratt & Whitney JT3D turbofans, the 707-120B debuted in 1961 and the 707-320B in 1962.
The 707-320C convertible passenger-freighter model entered service in 1963, and passenger 707s have been converted to freighter configurations.
Military derivatives include the E-3 Sentry airborne reconnaissance aircraft and the C-137 Stratoliner VIP transport.

A total of 865 Boeing 707s were produced and delivered, not including 154 Boeing 720s.

Development

Model 367-80 origins

During and after World War II Boeing was known for its military aircraft. The company had produced innovative and important bombers, from the B-17 Flying Fortress and B-29 Superfortress, to the jet-powered B-47 Stratojet and B-52 Stratofortress, but its commercial aircraft were not as successful as those from Douglas Aircraft and other competitors. As Douglas and Lockheed dominated the postwar air transport boom, the demand for Boeing's offering, the 377 Stratocruiser, quickly faded with only 56 examples sold and no new orders as the 1940s drew to a close. That venture had netted the company a $15 million loss. During 1949 and 1950, Boeing embarked on studies for a new jet transport and saw advantages with a design aimed at both military and civilian markets. Aerial refueling was becoming a standard technique for military aircraft, with over 800 KC-97 Stratofreighters on order. The KC-97 was not ideally suited for operations with the USAF's new fleets of jet-powered fighters and bombers; this was where Boeing's new design would win military orders.

As the first of a new generation of American passenger jets, Boeing wanted the aircraft's model number to emphasize the difference from its previous propeller-driven aircraft which bore 300-series numbers. The 400-, 500- and 600-series were already used by their missiles and other products, so Boeing decided that the jets would bear 700-series numbers, and the first would be the 707.  The marketing department at Boeing chose 707 because they thought it was more appealing than 700.

The project was enabled by the Pratt & Whitney JT3C turbojet engine, the civilian version of the J57 that yielded much more power than the previous generation of jet engines and was proving itself with the B-52.  Freed from the design constraints imposed by limitations of late-1940s jet engines, developing a robust, safe, and high capacity jet aircraft was within reach for Boeing.  Boeing studied numerous wing and engine layouts for its new transport/tanker, some of which were based on the B-47 and C-97, before settling on the 367-80 quadjet prototype aircraft. The "Dash 80" took less than two years from project launch in 1952 to rollout on May 14, 1954, then first flew on July 15, 1954.  The prototype was a proof-of-concept aircraft for both military and civilian use. The United States Air Force was the first customer, using it as the basis for the KC-135 Stratotanker aerial refueling and cargo aircraft.

Whether the passenger 707 would be profitable was far from certain. At the time, nearly all of Boeing's revenue came from military contracts.  In a demonstration flight over Lake Washington outside Seattle, on August 7, 1955, test pilot Tex Johnston performed a barrel roll in the 367-80 prototype. Although he justified his unauthorized action to Bill Allen, then president of Boeing, as selling the airplane with a 1 'g' maneuver he was told not to do it again.

Production and testing

The first flight of the first-production 707-120 took place on December 20, 1957, and FAA certification followed on September 18, 1958. Both test pilots Joseph John "Tym" Tymczyszyn and James R. Gannett were awarded the first Iven C. Kincheloe Award for the test flights that led to certification. A number of changes were incorporated into the production models from the prototype. A Krueger flap was installed along the leading edge between the inner and outer engines on early 707-120 and -320 models. This was in response to de Havilland Comet overrun accidents which occurred after over-rotating on take-off. Wing stall would also occur on the 707 with over-rotation so the leading-edge flaps were added to prevent stalling even with the tail dragging on the runway.

Further developments

The initial standard model was the 707-120 with JT3C turbojet engines. Qantas ordered a shorter-bodied version called the 707-138, which was a -120 with six fuselage frames removed, three in front of the wings, and three aft. With the maximum takeoff weight the same as that of the -120, the -138 was able to fly the longer routes that Qantas needed. Braniff International Airways ordered the higher-thrust version with Pratt & Whitney JT4A engines, the 707-220. The final major derivative was the 707-320, which featured an extended-span wing and JT4A engines, while the 707-420 was the same as the -320, but with Conway turbofan engines.

Though initially fitted with turbojet engines, the dominant engine for the Boeing 707 family was the Pratt & Whitney JT3D, a turbofan variant of the JT3C with lower fuel consumption and higher thrust. JT3D-engined 707s and 720s were denoted with a "B" suffix. The 707-320B series enabled nonstop westbound flights from Europe to the West Coast of the United States and from the US to Japan.

The final 707 variant was the 707-320C, (C for "Convertible"), which had a large fuselage door for cargo. It had a revised wing with three-sectioned leading-edge flaps, improving takeoff and landing performance and allowing the ventral fin to be removed (although the taller fin was retained). The 707-320Bs built after 1963 used the same wing as the -320C and were known as 707-320B Advanced aircraft.

In total, 1,010 707s were built for civilian use between 1958 and 1978, though many of these found their way to military service. The 707 production line remained open for purpose-built military variants until 1991, with the last new-build 707 airframes built as E-3 and E-6 aircraft.

Traces of the 707 are still found in the 737, which uses a modified version of the 707's fuselage, as well as the same external nose and cockpit configurations as those of the 707. These were also used on the previous 727, while the 757 also used the 707 fuselage cross-section.

Design

Wings
The 707's wings are swept back at 35°, and like all swept-wing aircraft, display an undesirable "Dutch roll" flying characteristic that manifests itself as an alternating combined yawing and rolling motion. Boeing already had considerable experience with this on the B-47 and B-52, and had developed the yaw damper system on the B-47 that would be applied to later swept-wing configurations like the 707. However, many pilots new to the 707 had no experience with this instability, as they were mostly accustomed to flying straight-wing propeller-driven aircraft such as the Douglas DC-7 and Lockheed Constellation.

On one customer-acceptance flight, where the yaw damper was turned off to familiarize the new pilots with flying techniques, a trainee pilot's actions violently exacerbated the Dutch roll motion and caused three of the four engines to be torn from the wings. The plane, a brand new 707-227, N7071, destined for Braniff, crash-landed on a river bed north of Seattle at Arlington, Washington, killing four of the eight occupants.

In his autobiography, test pilot Tex Johnston describes a Dutch roll incident he experienced as a passenger on an early commercial 707 flight. As the aircraft's movements did not cease and most of the passengers became ill, he suspected a misrigging of the directional autopilot (yaw damper). He went to the cockpit and found the crew unable to understand and resolve the situation. He introduced himself and relieved the ashen-faced captain, who immediately left the cockpit feeling ill. Johnston disconnected the faulty autopilot and manually stabilized the plane "with two slight control movements".

Tex Johnston recommended Boeing increase the height of the tail fin, add a boosted rudder, as well as add a ventral fin. These modifications were aimed at mitigating Dutch roll by providing more directional stability in yaw.

Engines

The 707 uses engine-driven turbocompressors to supply compressed air for cabin pressurization. On many commercial 707s, the outer port (number 1) engine mount is distinctly different from the other three, as this engine is not fitted with a turbocompressor. Later-model 707s typically had this configuration, although American Airlines had turbocompressors on engines 2 and 3 only. Early 707 models often had turbocompressor fairings on all four engines, but with only two or three compressors installed.

The JT3D-3B engines are readily identifiable by the large gray secondary-air inlet doors in the nose cowl. These doors are fully open (sucked in at the rear) during takeoff to provide additional air. The doors automatically close with increasing airspeed.

The 707 was the first commercial jet aircraft to be fitted with clamshell-type thrust reversers.

Upgraded engines

Pratt & Whitney, in a joint venture with Seven Q Seven (SQS) and Omega Air, selected the JT8D-219 as a replacement powerplant for Boeing 707-based aircraft, calling their modified configuration a 707RE. Northrop Grumman selected the -219 to re-engine the US Air Force's fleet of 19 E-8 Joint STARS aircraft, which would allow the J-STARS more time on station due to the engine's greater fuel efficiency. NATO also planned to re-engine their fleet of E-3 Sentry AWACS aircraft. The -219 is publicized as being half the cost of the competing powerplant, the CFM International CFM56, and is 40 dB quieter than the original JT3D engines.

Operational history

The first commercial orders for the 707 came on October 13, 1955, when Pan Am committed to 20 Boeing 707s, and 25 Douglas DC-8s, dramatically increasing their passenger capacity (in available revenue passenger seat-miles per hour/per day) over its existing fleet of propeller aircraft. The competition between the 707 and DC-8 was fierce. Pan American ordered these planes, when and as they did, so that they would be the operators of the "first-off" production line for each aircraft type. Until their initial batch of the aircraft had been delivered to them and put into operation, Pan American would have the distinction of being not only the "Launch Customer" for both transcontinental American jets, but the exclusive operator of American intercontinental jet transports for at least a year.

The only rival in intercontinental jet aircraft production at the time was the British de Havilland Comet. However, this was never real competition for the American market as the Comet series had been the subject of fatal accidents (due to design flaws) early in its introduction, withdrawn from service, virtually redesigned from scratch, and reintroduced as version -4. It was also smaller and slower than the 707. Several major airlines committed only to the (second place in the production race) Douglas DC-8. Airlines and their passengers at the time preferred the more established Douglas Aircraft maker of passenger aircraft. Douglas had decided to wait for a larger and more fuel efficient engine (Pratt & Whitney JT4A) and to design a larger and longer range aircraft around this engine. To stay competitive, Boeing made a late and costly decision to redesign and enlarge the 707's wing to help increase range and payload. The new version was the 707-320.

Pan Am was the first airline to operate the 707; the carrier inaugurated 707 service with a christening at National Airport on October 17, 1958, attended by President Eisenhower, followed by a transatlantic flight for VIPs (personal guests of founder Juan Trippe) from Baltimore's Friendship International Airport to Paris. The aircraft's first commercial flight was from Idlewild Airport, New York, to Le Bourget, Paris, on October 26, 1958, with a fuel stop in Gander, Newfoundland. In December, National Airlines operated the first US domestic jet airline flights between New York/Idlewild and Miami, using 707s leased from Pan Am; American Airlines was the first domestic airline to fly its own jets, on January 25, 1959. TWA started domestic 707-131 flights in March and Continental Airlines started 707-124 flights in June; airlines that had ordered only the DC-8, such as United, Delta, and Eastern, were left without jets until September and lost market share on transcontinental flights. Qantas was the first non-US airline to use the 707s, starting in 1959.

The 707 quickly became the most popular jetliner of its time. Its popularity led to rapid developments in airport terminals, runways, airline catering, baggage handling, reservations systems, and other air transport infrastructure. The advent of the 707 also led to the upgrading of air traffic control systems to prevent interference with military jet operations.

As the 1960s drew to a close, the exponential growth in air travel led to the 707 being a victim of its own success. The 707 was now too small to handle the increased numbers of passengers on the routes for which it was designed. Stretching the fuselage was not a viable option because the installation of larger, more powerful engines would need a larger undercarriage, which was not feasible given the design's limited ground clearance at takeoff. Boeing's answer to the problem was the first wide-body airliner—the Boeing 747. The 707's first-generation engine technology was also rapidly becoming obsolete in the areas of noise and fuel economy, especially after the 1973 oil crisis.

In 1982, during the Falklands War, the Argentine Air Force used 707s to track the approaching task force. They were escorted away by Royal Navy Sea Harriers without being able to approach closer than 80 miles.

Operations of the 707 were threatened by the enactment of international noise regulations in 1985. Shannon Engineering of Seattle developed a hush kit with funding from Tracor, Inc, of Austin, Texas. By the late 1980s, 172 Boeing 707s had been equipped with the Quiet 707 package. Boeing acknowledged that more 707s were in service than before the hush kit was available.

Trans World Airlines flew the last scheduled 707 flight for passengers by a US carrier on October 30, 1983, although 707s remained in scheduled service by airlines from other nations for much longer. Middle East Airlines  of Lebanon flew 707s and 720s in front-line passenger service until the end of the 1990s. Since LADE of Argentina removed its 707-320Bs from regular service in 2007, Saha Airlines of Iran was the last commercial operator of the Boeing 707. After suspending its scheduled passenger service in April 2013, Saha continued to operate a small fleet of 707s on behalf of the Iranian Air Force.

As of 2019, only a handful of 707s remain in operation, acting as military aircraft for aerial refueling, transport, and AWACS missions.

Variants

Although certified as Series 100s, 200s, 300s, etc., the different 707 variants are more commonly known as Series 120s, 220s, 320s, and so on, where the "20" part of the designation is Boeing's "customer number" for its development aircraft.

707-020

Announced in July 1957 as a derivative for shorter flights from shorter runways, the 707-020 first flew on November 23, 1959.
Its type certificate was issued on June 30, 1960, and it entered service with United Airlines on July 5, 1960.
As a derivative, the 720 had low development costs, allowing profitability despite few sales.

Compared to the 707-120, it has a length reduced by 9 feet (2.7 m), a modified wing and a lightened airframe for a lower maximum takeoff weight.
Powered by four Pratt & Whitney JT3C turbojets, the initial 720 could cover a  range with 131 passengers in two classes.

Powered by JT3D turbofans, the 720B first flew on October 6, 1960, and entered service in March 1961.
It could seat 156 passengers in one class over a  range. 
A total of 154 Boeing 720s and 720Bs were built until 1967. Some 720s were later converted to the 720B specification.
The 720 was succeeded by the Boeing 727 trijet.

707-120 
The 707-120 was the first production 707 variant, with a longer, wider fuselage, and greater wingspan than the Dash 80. The cabin had a full set of rectangular windows and could seat up to 189 passengers. It was designed for transcontinental routes, and often required a refueling stop when flying across the North Atlantic. It had four Pratt & Whitney JT3C-6 turbojets, civilian versions of the military J57, initially producing  with water injection. Major orders were the launch order for 20 707-121 aircraft by Pan Am and an American Airlines order for 30 707-123 aircraft. The first revenue flight was on October 26, 1958; 56 were built, plus seven short-bodied -138s; the last -120 was delivered to Western in May 1960.

 
Maximum takeoff weight was the same  as the standard version. It was a variant for Qantas, thus had its customer number 38. To allow for full-load takeoffs at the midflight refueling stop in Fiji, the wing's leading-edge slats were modified for increased lift, and the allowable temperature range for use of full takeoff power was increased by 10°F (5.5°C). Seven -138s were delivered to Qantas between June and September 1959, and they first carried passengers in July of that year.

(This thrust did not require water injection, eliminating both the system and 5000–6000 lb of water.) The -120B had the wing modifications introduced on the 720 and a longer tailplane; a total of 72 were built, 31 for American and 41 for TWA, plus six short-bodied -138Bs for Qantas. American had its 23 surviving -123s converted to -123Bs, but TWA did not convert its 15 -131s. The only other conversions were Pan American's five surviving -121s and one surviving -139, the three aircraft delivered to the USAF as -153s and the seven short-bodied Qantas -138s (making 13 total 707s delivered to Qantas between 1959 and 1964). The first flight of the -120B was on June 22, 1960, and American carried the first passengers in March 1961; the last delivery was to American in April 1969.

707-220
The 707-220 was designed for hot and high operations with more powerful  Pratt & Whitney JT4A-3 turbojets. Five of these were produced, but only four were ultimately delivered, with one being lost during a test flight. All were for Braniff International Airways and carried the model number 707-227; the first entered service in December 1959. This version was made obsolete by the arrival of the turbofan-powered 707-120B.

707-320

The 707-320 Intercontinental is a stretched version of the turbojet-powered 707-120, initially powered by JT4A-3 or JT4A-5 turbojets producing  each (most eventually got  JT4A-11s). The wing modifications included outboard and inboard inserts, as well as a kink in the trailing edge to add area inboard. Its first flight was on January 11, 1958; 69 turbojet 707-320s were delivered through January 1963, the first passengers being carried (by Pan Am) in August 1959.

707-420

The 707-420 was identical to the -320, but fitted with Rolls-Royce Conway 508 (RCo.12) turbofans (or by-pass turbojets as Rolls-Royce called them) of  thrust each. The first announced customer was Lufthansa. BOAC's controversial order was announced six months later, but the British carrier got the first service-ready aircraft off the production line. The British Air Registration Board refused to give the aircraft a certificate of airworthiness, citing insufficient yaw control, excessive rudder forces, and the ability to over-rotate on takeoff, stalling the wing on the ground (a fault of the de Havilland Comet 1). Boeing responded by adding  to the vertical stabilizer, applying full instead of partial rudder boost, and fitting an underfin to prevent over-rotation. These modifications except to the fin under the tail became standard on all 707 variants and were retrofitted to all earlier 707s. The 37 -420s were delivered to BOAC, Lufthansa, Air-India, El Al, and Varig through November 1963; Lufthansa was the first to carry passengers, in March 1960.

707-320B

The 707-320B had the application of the JT3D turbofan to the Intercontinental, but with aerodynamic refinements. The wing was modified from the -320 by adding a second inboard kink, a dog-toothed leading edge, and curved low-drag wingtips instead of the earlier blunt ones. These wingtips increased overall wingspan by 3.0 ft. The 175 707-320B aircraft were all new-build; no original -320 models were converted to fan engines in civilian use. First service was June 1962, with Pan Am.

The 707-320B Advanced is an improved version of the -320B, adding the three-section leading-edge flaps already seen on the -320C. These reduced takeoff and landing speeds and altered the lift distribution of the wing, allowing the ventral fin found on earlier 707s to be deleted. From 1965, -320Bs had the uprated -320C undercarriage allowing the same  MTOW. These were often identified as 707-320BA-H.

707-320C

The 707-320C has a convertible passenger–freight configuration, which became the most widely produced variant of the 707. The 707-320C added a strengthened floor and a new cargo door to the -320B model. The wing was fitted with three-section leading-edge flaps which allowed the deletion of the underfin. Most -320Cs were delivered as passenger aircraft with airlines hoping the cargo door would increase second-hand values. The addition of two additional emergency exits, one on either side aft of the wing raised the maximum passenger limit to 219. Only a few aircraft were delivered as pure freighters. One of the final orders was by the Iranian Government for 14 707-3J9C aircraft capable of VIP transportation, communication, and in-flight refueling tasks.

707-700
The 707-700 was a test aircraft used to study the feasibility of using CFM International CFM56 engines on a 707 airframe and possibly retrofitting existing aircraft with the engine. After testing in 1979, N707QT, the last commercial 707 airframe, was restored to 707-320C configuration and delivered to the Moroccan Air Force as a tanker aircraft via a "civilian" order. Boeing abandoned the retrofit program, since it felt it would be a threat to the Boeing 757 and Boeing 767 programs. The information gathered from testing led to the eventual retrofitting of CFM56 engines to the USAF C-135/KC-135R models, and some military versions of the 707 also used the CFM56. The Douglas DC-8 "Super 70" series with CFM56 engines was developed and extended the DC-8's life in a stricter noise regulatory environment. As a result, significantly more DC-8s remained in service into the 21st century than 707s.

Undeveloped variants
The 707-620 was a proposed domestic range-stretched variant of the 707-320B. The 707-620 was to carry around 200 passengers while retaining several aspects of the 707-320B. It would have been delivered around 1968 and would have also been Boeing's answer to the stretched Douglas DC-8 Series 60. Had the 707-620 been built, it would have cost around US$8,000,000. However, engineers discovered that a longer fuselage and wing meant a painstaking redesign of the wing and landing-gear structures. Rather than spend money on upgrading the 707, engineer Joe Sutter stated the company "decided spending money on the 707 wasn't worth it". The project was cancelled in 1966 in favor of the newer Boeing 747.

The 707-820 was a proposed intercontinental stretched variant of the 707-320B. Two variations were proposed, the 707-820(505) model and the 707-820(506) model. This model would have carried 209 passengers in mixed-class configuration and 260 passengers in all-economy configuration. This second model would have carried 225 passengers in mixed-class configuration and 279 passengers in all-economy configuration. Like the 707-620, the 707-820 was also set to compete with the stretched DC-8-60 Super Series models. The design was being pitched to American, TWA, BOAC, and Pan Am at the time of its proposal in early 1965. The 707-820 would have cost US$10,000,000. Like the 707-620, the 707-820 would have required a massive structural redesign to the wing and gear structures. The 707-820 was also cancelled in 1966 in favor of the 747.

Military versions

The militaries of the US and other countries have used the civilian 707 aircraft in a variety of roles, and under different designations. (The 707 and US Air Force's KC-135 were developed in parallel from the Boeing 367–80 prototype.)

The Boeing E-3 Sentry is a US military airborne warning and control system (AWACS) aircraft based on the Boeing 707 that provides all-weather surveillance, command, control, and communications.

The Northrop Grumman E-8 Joint STARS is an aircraft modified from the Boeing 707-300 series commercial airliner. The E-8 carries specialized radar, communications, operations and control subsystems. The most prominent external feature is the 40 ft (12 m) canoe-shaped radome under the forward fuselage that houses the 24 ft (7.3 m) APY-7 active electronically scanned array side looking airborne radar antenna.

The VC-137 variant of the Stratoliner was a special-purpose design meant to serve as Air Force One, the secure transport for the President of the United States. These models were in operational use from 1962 to 1990. The first presidential jet aircraft, a VC-137B designated SAM 970, is on display at the Boeing Museum of Flight in Seattle. Two VC-137C aircraft are on display with SAM 26000 at the National Museum of the United States Air Force near Dayton, Ohio and SAM 27000 at the Ronald Reagan Presidential Library in Simi Valley, California.

The Canadian Forces also operated the Boeing 707 with the designation CC-137 Husky (707-347C) from 1971 to 1997.

Boeing 717 was the company designation for the C-135 Stratolifter and KC-135 Stratotanker derivatives of the 367-80. (The 717 designation was later reused in renaming the McDonnell Douglas MD-95 to Boeing 717 after the company merged with Boeing.)

Operators

Boeing's customer codes used to identify specific options and livery specified by customers was started with the 707, and has been maintained through all Boeing's models. In essence the same system as used on the earlier Boeing 377, the code consisted of two digits affixed to the model number to identify the specific aircraft version. For example, Pan American World Airways was assigned code "21". Thus, a 707-320B sold to Pan Am had the model number 707-321B. The number remained constant as further aircraft were purchased; thus, when Pan American purchased the 747-100, it had the model number 747-121.

In the 1980s, the USAF acquired around 250 used 707s to provide replacement turbofan engines for the KC-135E Stratotanker program.

The 707 is no longer operated by major airlines. American actor John Travolta owned an ex-Qantas 707-138B, with the registration N707JT. In May 2017, he donated the plane to the Historical Aircraft Restoration Society near Wollongong, Australia. The plane will be flown to Illawarra Regional Airport, where HARS is based, once repairs to ensure safe flying condition have been completed.

Orders and deliveries

Deliveries

707 Model summary

Accidents and incidents

As of January 2019, the 707 has been in 261 aviation occurrences and 174 hull-loss accidents with a total of 3,039 fatalities. The deadliest incident involving the 707 was the Agadir air disaster which took place on August 3, 1975 with 188 fatalities.

On January 14, 2019, a Saha Airlines cargo flight crashed, killing 15 people and seriously injuring one more person. It was the last civil 707 in operation.

Aircraft on display

 VH-XBA model 707-138B (number 29) is one of the first 707s exported, and the first civilian jet registered in Australia (to airline Qantas in 1959); it is on display at the Qantas Founders Outback Museum in Longreach, Queensland, Australia.
 4X-BYD model 707-131(F), (number 34), an ex-Israeli Air Force and TWA aircraft, is on display at the Israeli Air Force Museum near Hatzerim, Israel.
 OO-SJA model 707-329 (number 78), ex-Sabena, is the first jetliner registered in Belgium; forward fuselage, salvaged following an uncontained engine failure and emergency landing, is on display at the Royal Military Museum Brussels.
 4X-JYW model 707-328 (msn. 173617, number 110), is a former Air France (F-BHSE) aircraft sold to the Israeli Air Force; it is on display at the Israeli Air Force Museum, Beersheba – Hatzerim (LLHB).
 G-APFJ model 707-436 (msn. 17711, number 163) is a forward fuselage on display at the National Museum of Flight, East Fortune, in BOAC livery.
 D-ABOB model 707-430 (msn. 17720, number 115) is a former Lufthansa airliner on display at Hamburg Airport (HAM/EDDH); it was originally registered as D-ABOD. On June 9, 2021 the aircraft was towed to Stand 65 at the airport where it will be scrapped due to high maintenance costs.
N7515A model 707-123 (msn. 17642, number 41), posing as D-ABOF, a 707-430 formerly operated by Lufthansa has its nose section preserved at the Deutsches Museum in Munich.
4X-ATA model 707-458 (msn. 18070, number 205) is a former El Al aircraft, the nose of which is preserved at the Cradle of Aviation Museum in Garden City, New York.
 CC-CCG model 707-330B (msn. 18642, number 233), an ex-Lufthansa and LAN Chile craft, is undergoing restoration at Santiago – Los Cerillos, Chile (ULC/SCTI) and will be repainted in the Chilean airline's 1960s scheme.
 F-BLCD model 707-328B (number 471) is on display at the Musée de l'Air et de l'Espace, Paris, France.
 EP-IRJ model 707-321B (msn. 18958, number 475), a former Iran Air aircraft, was originally delivered to Pan American as N416PA, and is currently the Air Restaurant at Mehrabad Airport, Tehran.
 A20-627 model 707-338C (msn. 19627, number 707) flew with the RAAF. Originally delivered to Qantas as VH-EAG, its forward fuselage is preserved at the Historical Aircraft Restoration Society, Albion Park Rail, New South Wales, Australia.
 1419 model 707-328C (msn. 19917, number 763), an ex-SAAF aircraft, is on display at the South African Air Force Museum – Swartkop Air Force Base, Pretoria.
 N893PA model 707-321B (msn. 20030, number 791), a former CAAC aircraft originally delivered to Pan American, is preserved at Tianjin, China.
 HZ-HM2 Model 707-386C (msn. 21081, number 903) is a Saudi Air Force VIP aircraft painted in the current Saudia color scheme; delivered in 1975, it is registered as HZ-HM1 and preserved at the Saudi Air Force Museum, Riyadh.

Specifications

See also

References

Footnotes

Citations

Bibliography

 
 
 Breffort, Dominique. Boeing 707, KC-135 and Civilian and Military Versions. Paris: Histoire & Collections, 2008. .
 Caidin, Martin. Boeing 707. New York: Bantam Books, 1959. 
 Cearley, George Walker. Boeing 707 & 720: A Pictorial History. Dallas, TX: G.W. Cearley Jr, 1993. 
 Francillon, René. Boeing 707: Pioneer Jetliner. Shrewsbury, Shropshire, UK: Motor Books International, 1999. .
 Cook, William H. Road to the 707: The Inside Story of Designing the 707. Bellevue, WA: TYC Publishing Company, 1991. .
 
 Kennedy, Charles. Boeing 707 Manual. Sparkford, Yeovil, Somerset, UK: Haynes Publishing, 2018. .
 Lloyd, Alwyn T. Boeing 707 & AWACS in Detail and Scale. Falbrook, CA: Aero Publishers, 1987. .
 
 Price, Alfred. The Boeing 707. Leatherhead, Surrey, UK: Profile Publications, 1967. 
 Proctor, Jon. Boeing 720. Miami, FL: World Transport Press, 2001. .
 Schiff, Barry J. The Boeing 707. Blue Ridge Summit, PA: Tab Books, 1982, First edition 1967. .
 Smith, Paul Raymond. Boeing 707 – Airline Markings No. 3. Shrewsbury, Shropshire, UK: Swan Hill Press, 1993. .
 Stachiw, Anthony L. and Andrew Tattersall. Boeing CC137 (Boeing 347C) in Canadian Service. St. Catherines, ON: Vanwell Publishing Ltd., 2004. .
 Whittle, John A. The Boeing 707 and 720. Tonbridge, Kent: Air Britain (Historians), 1972. .
 
 
 Winchester, Jim (2002). Boeing 707. Shrewsbury, Shropshire, UK: Airlife. .

External links

 
 
 
 
  – (archive not available)
 
 
Boeing 707: The aircraft that changed the way we fly, BBC Culture, October 2014

 
707
1950s United States airliners
Quadjets
Low-wing aircraft
Aircraft first flown in 1957